The National Recording Registry is a list of sound recordings that "are culturally, historically, or aesthetically significant, and/or inform or reflect life in the United States." The registry was established by the National Recording Preservation Act of 2000, which created the National Recording Preservation Board, whose members are appointed by the Librarian of Congress. The recordings preserved in the United States National Recording Registry form a registry of recordings selected yearly by the National Recording Preservation Board for preservation in the Library of Congress.

The National Recording Preservation Act of 2000 established a national program to guard America's sound recording heritage. The Act created the National Recording Registry, The National Recording Preservation Board and a fund-raising foundation. The purpose of the Registry is to maintain and preserve sound recordings and collections of sound recordings that are culturally, historically, or aesthetically significant. Beginning in 2002, the National Recording Preservation Board has selected recordings nominated each year to be preserved. On January 27, 2003, the first 50 recordings were announced by James Billington, the Librarian of Congress.

The first four yearly lists each had 50 selections. Since 2006, 25 recordings have been selected annually. , a total of 600 recordings have been preserved in the Registry. Each calendar year, public nominations are accepted for inclusion in that year's list of selections, which are announced the following spring.

Registry title works, original or copies, are housed at the Library of Congress' Packard Campus for Audio Video Conservation. Each yearly list typically includes a few recordings that have also been selected for inclusion in the holdings of the National Archives' audiovisual collection. Recordings on the National Recording Registry that are of a political nature tend to overlap with the audiovisual collection of the National Archives.

Selection criteria

The criteria for selection are:
 Recordings selected for the National Recording Registry are "culturally, historically or aesthetically significant", and/or inform or reflect culture in the United States.
 Recordings will not be considered for inclusion in the National Recording Registry if no copy of the recording exists.
 No recording is eligible for inclusion in the National Recording Registry until ten years after the recording's creation.

Inductees
The list shows overlapping items and whether the National Archives has an original or a copy of the recording.

Notes

Statistics
, the oldest recording on the list is Edouard-Leon Scott de Martinville's Phonautograms which date back to the 1850s. The most recent is the Robin Williams episode of WTF with Marc Maron from 2010.

Selections vary widely in duration. The early Edison recordings and the instrumental "Rumble" by Link Wray, as well as "Rock Around the Clock" by Bill Haley and His Comets clock in at under three minutes. The Edison "Talking Doll" cylinder is only 17 seconds long and some of Scott de Martinville's Phonautographs are just as brief. Meanwhile, Georg Solti's recording of Wagner's complete Ring Cycle is approximately 15 hours in duration, Alexander Scourby's recitation of the King James Bible is over 80 hours, and Lyndon B. Johnson's recordings are nearly 850 hours in length.

Artists with/people who appear on multiple entries

See also

 Grammy Hall of Fame
 National Film Registry
 Sounds of Australia
 Rock and Roll Hall of Fame

References

External links
 National Recording Preservation Board
 Full National Recording Registry
 NPR All Things Considered – series spotlighting selections from the Registry
 Selection spotlights on WNYC
 National Recording Registry selections videos each on the official Library of Congress YouTube channel
 BMP Audio documentaries on selected inductees
 Inductees featured in Sounds of America documentaries on 1A

United States history-related lists
Library of Congress
Music-related lists
Reference material lists
 
2000 establishments in the United States